"Pilot" is the first episode of the crime drama television series Person of Interest. It originally aired on CBS in the United States on September 22, 2011. The episode was written by series creator Jonathan Nolan and directed by David Semel.

Reviews for the episode were largely positive. In the United States, the series premiere achieved a viewership of 13.33 million.

Plot
John Reese (Jim Caviezel), a former CIA Agent and United States Army Special Forces soldier-turned homeless alcoholic, has a struggle with a group of hot-headed teenagers on the subway in New York City. After this, he is extracted from police custody before New York Police Department Homicide Detective Joss Carter (Taraji P. Henson) can confront him on his links to previous killings discovered through analysis of his fingerprints on the police system. Reese is brought to a mysterious and somewhat secretive billionaire, Harold Finch (Michael Emerson), who is the creator of the next-generation software known simply as "The Machine". After 9/11, Finch developed a computer program that can sift through enormous amounts of data, looking for patterns of behavior or activity that would predict another attack. It also provided information about individuals who could be in danger; it can predict the identity of a person involved in a premeditated crime that will happen at some point in the future – however, Finch's back-door link to the Machine only provides the Social Security number of the person, and offers no clues to their involvement or when the crime will take place. Finch, who feels a need to do something to help these people, enlists Reese to aid him in preventing these crimes. Finch offers Reese a job to do this, as well as give Reese a purpose following the death of his girlfriend, Jessica (Susan Misner) (which is the source of his depression). The first on his list is Diane Hansen (Natalie Zea), an Assistant District Attorney currently working on a major prosecution of a prominent drug killing. Reese agrees to help and begins by watching her. Reese soon learns that Hansen is not the victim, but the perpetrator running a ring of corrupt police officers and planning to kill a fellow DA, Wheeler (Brian d'Arcy James). After blackmailing one of the corrupt officers, Detective Lionel Fusco (Kevin Chapman), into being his source of information inside the NYPD, Reese reveals Hansen's corruption to an open court, kills Detective Stills (James Hanlon), the leader of the corrupt gang of cops, and links Fusco to the crime to ensure his future cooperation. Having previously rejected Finch's offer of work, Reese recants and agrees to continue preventing violent crimes.

Reception

Ratings
In its original American broadcast, "Pilot" was seen by an estimated 13.33 million household viewers and gained a 3.1 ratings share among adults aged 18–49, according to Nielsen Media Research.

Critical reception
David Wiegand of the San Francisco Chronicle wrote: "Person of Interest separates itself from the gimmick pack, not only because of superbly nuanced characterization and writing but also because of how it engages a post-9/11 sense of paranoia in its viewers." David Hinckley of the New York Daily News gave the pilot four stars out of five, commenting on Caviezel's and Emerson's performances, saying Caviezel "brings the right stuff to this role" and Emerson "is fascinating as Mr. Finch." Mary McNamara of the Los Angeles Times stated that in regards to the pilot, "the notion of preventing crimes rather than solving them is an appealing twist... The surveillance graphics are very cool."

References

External links
 "Pilot" at CBS
 
 "Pilot" at TV Guide

Person of Interest (TV series) episodes
2011 American television episodes
Television episodes written by Jonathan Nolan
Person of Interest